Located on State Route 8 in Riner, Virginia, United States, Auburn High School serves the communities of Riner and Pilot as well as a large area of southern Montgomery County. Auburn started out during the great depression as a one-room schoolhouse located in a log cabin built by students

Extracurricular activities
In team sports, Auburn won three straight Virginia High School League 1A girls volleyball championships between 2012–2014 and four straight Class 1 titles from 2019-2022.  It won two straight group A state championship in boys tennis between 1973 and 1974. In 2014 it won the boys 1A outdoor track championship and it won the 1967 group III state championship in boys basketball 79–70 over West Point High School.

On November 14, 2015 the Auburn boys won their first ever state XC team title by edging out Alta-Vista Combined school. Auburn boys went on to win three more VHSL Cross Country championships in 2016, 2017, and 2018, producing a four-peat. 

In debate, Auburn won the overall team championship in 2005.

References

External links
Auburn Middle and High School

Public high schools in Virginia
Schools in Montgomery County, Virginia